Waldbronn is a municipality in the district of Karlsruhe, in Baden-Württemberg, Germany.

Geography
Waldbronn is located at the border of the Alb-Pfinz-Plateau in the valley of the river Alb.

History
Waldbronn was founded in 1972 as a result of a municipal restructuring, when the communities Busenbach and Reichenbach merged. A year earlier the community of Etzenrot had been merged with Reichenbach already.

The three communities are first mentioned in historic documents in 1292.

In January 1994 Waldbronn was awarded the official status of  "Ort mit Heilquellen-Kurbetrieb", indicating the 	medicinal benefits of its hot wells.

Transport
Reichenbach is connected to the city of Karlsruhe by S 11 services operating over the Busenbach–Ittersbach railway, an electric railway that forms part of the Karlsruhe Stadtbahn.

Sons and daughters 
 Edmund Becker (born 1956), German football player and coach
 Max Giesinger (born 1988), German singer

References

Karlsruhe (district)